Thomas Davies (bishop) (c. 1511–1573), Welsh clergyman, Bishop of St Asaph, 1561–1573
Thomas Davies (physician) (died 1615) English physician, see Lumleian Lectures

Thomas Davies (bookseller) (c. 1713–1785), London-based Scottish bookseller
Thomas Davies (brewer) (?–1869), see Don Brewery
Thomas Davies (British Army officer) (c. 1737–1812), Royal Artillery officer, artist, and naturalist
Thomas Alfred Davies (1809–1899), American Civil War general
Thomas Davies (Conservative politician) (1858–1939), British Member of Parliament for Cirencester and Tewkesbury, 1918–1929
Thomas Davies (Australian politician) (1881–1942), Australian politician
Thomas F. Davis (1804–1871), fifth Episcopal Bishop of South Carolina
Thomas Frederick Davies Sr. (1831–1905), third bishop of the Episcopal Diocese of Michigan, 1889–1905
Thomas Frederick Davies Jr. (1872–1936), second bishop of the Episcopal Diocese of Western Massachusetts, 1911–1936
Thomas Henry Hastings Davies (1789–1846), British Member of Parliament for Worcester
Thomas Stephens Davies (c. 1794–1851), British mathematician
Thomas Nathaniel Davies (1922–1996), Welsh artist
Tom Davies (born 1990), better known as GeoWizard
T. Glynne Davies (1926–1988), Welsh poet, novelist and broadcaster

Sportspeople
Thomas Davies (footballer, born 1865) (1865–?), Oswestry Town F.C. and Wales international footballer
Thomas Davies (footballer, born 1872) (1872–1950s), Druids F.C. and Wales international footballer
Tom Davies (American football) (1896–1972), American football player and coach
Tom Davies (footballer, fl. 1894–1911), English footballer who played for Burslem Port Vale
Tom Davies (footballer, born 1882) (1882–1967), English footballer who played for Swindon Town, Nottingham Forest, Reading and Southampton
Tom Davies (footballer, born 1992), English professional footballer
Tom Davies (footballer, born 1998), English professional footballer
Tom Davies (rugby union, born 1986), Welsh rugby union player
Tom Davies (rugby union, born 1993), Welsh rugby union player
Tom Davies (rugby league) (born 1997), English rugby league footballer
Tommy Davies (1920–1998), Welsh welterweight boxer
Thomas Davies (footballer, born 2003), Welsh professional footballer
Mervyn Davies (Thomas Mervyn Davies, 1946–2012), Welsh rugby union player

See also
Thomas Davis (disambiguation)